A resist is something that is added to parts of an object to create a pattern by protecting these parts from being affected by a subsequent stage in the manufacturing process.

Resist may also refer to:

 Resist dyeing, applied to textiles
 Photoresist (often just referred to as "resist") applied to photolithography
 Resist (semiconductor fabrication), applied to semiconductor fabrication

Music
 Resist (Kosheen album), or the title song
Resist (Midnight Oil album), 2022
Resist (Within Temptation album)
Kuʻe, translated Resist, album by Sudden Rush
 "Resist", a song by As Blood Runs Black from the album Instinct
 "Resist", a song by Front Line Assembly from the album Caustic Grip
 "Resist", a song by Grief of War from the album A Mounting Crisis...As Their Fury Got Released
 "Resist", a song by M.O.D. from the album Devolution
 "Resist", a song by Rush from the album Test for Echo
 "Resist", a song by Armageddon Dildos
 "Resist", a song by Levitation
 Resist Records, label
 Resist Music, label related to React Music Limited

Organizations
 RESIST (electoral list), which contested the 2003 Belgian general election
 RESIST (non-profit), based in Somerville, Massachusetts, United States
 Resist, The Resistance Movement, The Resist Festival, Resistance TV, a network of left-wing groups launched by politician Chris Williamson in the UK in 2019.

Other uses
 "Resist" (Supergirl), an episode of the television series Supergirl
 Response Evaluation Criteria in Solid Tumors, a set of rules for evaluating responses in cancer treatment
 The Resistance (American political movement), a predominantly left-wing movement that protests Donald Trump's presidency

See also
 "Refuse/Resist", song by Sepultura from the album Chaos A.D.
 Resistance (disambiguation)
 Resistor